Adrián González (born 1982) is an American baseball first baseman.

Adrian Gonzalez or Adrián González may also refer to:

Sports
 Adrián González (cyclist) (born 1992), Spanish cyclist
 Adrián González (footballer, born 1976), Argentine footballer
 Adrián González (footballer, born 1988), Spanish footballer
 Adrián González (footballer, born 1995), Argentine footballer
 Adrián González (footballer, born 2003), Mexican footballer

Others
 Adrian Gonzalez (kidnapper) (born 2000), American kidnapper
 Adrián Luis González (born 1939), Mexican potter

See also
 Adrian Gonzales (1937–1998), Filipino comics artist